The Binder parameter or Binder cumulant in statistical physics, also known as the fourth-order cumulant  is defined as the kurtosis of the order parameter, s introduced by Austrian theoretical physicist Kurt Binder. It is frequently used to determine accurately phase transition points in numerical simulations of various models. 

The phase transition point is usually identified comparing the
The transition temperature is the unique point where the different curves cross in the thermodynamic limit. This behavior is based on the fact that 

Accordingly, the cumulant may also be used to identify the universality class of the transition by determining the value of the critical exponent  of the correlation length. 

In the thermodynamic limit, at the critical point, the value of the Binder parameter depends on boundary conditions, the shape of the system, and anisotropy of correlations.

References 

Statistical mechanics